Apostolides v Orams is a landmark legal case decided in the European Court of Justice on 28 April 2009. It concerned the right for Greek Cypriot refugees to reclaim land in northern Cyprus, displaced after the Turkish invasion of Cyprus in 1974. The case determined that although Cyprus does not exercise effective control in northern Cyprus, cases decided in its courts are applicable through European Union law.

Background to the case
In 1974, Meletios Apostolides, an architect, was displaced with his family from his property in Lapithos as a result of the partition of Cyprus which followed a Greek Cypriot coup and the subsequent Turkish invasion of Cyprus.

In 2002, David Charles and Linda Elizabeth Orams, from Hove, Sussex, England, invested £160,000 of their retirement fund to acquire the land from a third party and to construct a villa on the premises. The third party claimed to have acquired the property from the Turkish Republic of Northern Cyprus (TRNC), a de facto state which, to this day, has not been recognised by any state except the Republic of Turkey. The Orams used the property in northern Cyprus for vacations and maintained a separate property in the UK.

In 2003, the de facto administration of northern Cyprus eased crossing restrictions along the ceasefire line giving the opportunity to displaced Cypriots to visit their old properties. Meletios Apostolides visited his property and confirmed the construction of the house occupied by the Orams.

Legal proceeding in Cyprus

Meletios Apostolides took his case to the Nicosia District court, demanding that the Orams vacate his property. Northern Cyprus, although a de facto functioning entity, remains an unrecognised state internationally. Mr Apostolides' case centred on the argument that although following the Turkish invasion the government of Cyprus had lost effective control over the northern part of the island, its laws still applied even if these were not easily enforceable.

In November 2004, the Nicosia District Court ordered the Orams to:
demolish the villa, swimming pool and fencing which they had erected on what the court regarded as Mr Apostolides' land
deliver immediately to Mr Apostolides free possession of the land
pay Mr Apostolides various sums by way of special damages and monthly rental charges (including interest) until the judgement was complied with
refrain from continuing with the unlawful intervention on the land, whether personally or through their agents, and
pay various sums in respect of the costs and expenses of the proceedings (with interest on those sums).

The Orams appealed this decision, which was heard at the supreme court of Cyprus. The appeal was dismissed.

Legal proceeding in England and Wales
Due to the island's division, the judgement reached by the Cypriot court was not directly enforceable, hence Mr Apostolides used EU regulations to have it registered and applied against the Orams' assets in the UK. The procedure for the enforcement of judgements between Member States of the European Union is provided by Regulation No 44/2001. The Orams were represented in the English courts by Cherie Blair, an action criticised by the then president of Cyprus Tassos Papadopoulos. He argued that due to its political nature, the wife of a Prime Minister should not be involved in such a case.

In September 2006, the High Court of Justice ruled in favour of the Orams. Mr Apostolides appealed the decision at the Court of Appeal which in turn referred the case to the European Court of Justice (ECJ), in Luxembourg.
The ECJ in turn ruled in favour of Mr Apostolides (see next section below).

The case was then returned to the Court of Appeal in England which decided in favour of Meletios Apostolides on 19 January 2010. According to one of the judges of the Court of Appeal panel, under the current system, this decision is final and no further escalation is possible. However, the Orams tried to appeal to the Supreme Court of the United Kingdom.

On 26 March 2010, the U.K. Supreme Court refused permission for the Orams to take the case to appeal, effectively bringing it to a conclusion. The Cyprus Mail reported that the Orams' had abandoned the property rather than demolish it.

Legal proceeding in the EU
The case C-420/07, Apostolides v Orams, was heard by the Grand Chamber of the European Court of Justice in Luxembourg. A panel of judges ruled on 28 April 2009 that British courts were able to enforce the judicial decisions made in Cyprus, which uphold the property rights of Cypriots forced out during the invasion.

Implications
The case has been described as a landmark test case as it sets a precedent for other Cypriots (primarily Greek Cypriot refugees) to bring similar actions to court.

Both the British High Commission in Cyprus and the Foreign and Commonwealth Office have issued warnings regarding the purchase of property in northern Cyprus.

Following the final ruling by the Court of Appeal in England, Meletios Apostolides' lawyer Constantis Candounas stated that he was considering similar lawsuits against foreign tourists using hotels in the TRNC that were owned by Greek Cypriots previous to the partition of Cyprus.

See also
Northern Cyprus and the European Union
Loizidou v. Turkey
Human rights in Turkey
Greek Cypriots, et al. v. TRNC and HSBC Bank USA
Annan Plan

References

Court of Justice of the European Union case law
Court of Appeal (England and Wales) cases
2009 in case law
2009 in Cyprus
2009 in Northern Cyprus
History of Northern Cyprus
Cyprus dispute
2010 in British law